The AFI Award for Best Documentary was an award presented by the Australian Film Institute in the annual AFI Awards. The category was superseded in 2008 with an award for Best Feature Length Documentary.

Winners and nominees
Winners are highlighted and in bold.

References

External links
 Official website of the Australian Academy of Cinema and Television Arts

1958 establishments in Australia
Documentary
Lists of films by award
Australian film awards